Danny Benson (born 15 November 2003) is an English professional footballer who plays as a defender for  club Barnsley.

Career
Benson joined the youth-team at Barnsley in October 2017 and signed as a first-year scholar in July 2020. He was called up to the first-team and was an unused substitute in an FA Cup tie with Barrow in January 2022. He turned professional at the club in July 2022. He made his senior debut on 30 August 2022, coming on as a 74th-minute substitute for Jasper Moon in a 3–0 EFL Trophy group stage defeat to Lincoln City at Oakwell.

Career statistics

References

2003 births
Living people
English footballers
Association football defenders
Barnsley F.C. players